Kalvakuntla Chandrashekar Rao (born 17 February 1954), often referred to by his initials KCR, is an Indian politician serving as the first and current Chief Minister of Telangana since 2 June 2014. He is the founder and leader of the Bharat Rashtra Samithi, a state party in India. He is known for leading the Telangana movement to achieve statehood for Telangana. Previously, he served as the Union Minister of Labour and Employment from 2004 to 2006. He represents Gajwel constituency in the Legislative Assembly of Telangana. Rao took oath as the first Chief Minister of Telangana in 2014 and was re-elected for the second term in 2018.

Early life 

Chandrashekar Rao was born to Raghava Rao and Venkatamma on 17 February 1954 in Chintamadaka village near Siddipet of present-day Telangana. Rao has 9 sisters and 1 elder brother. He attained a MA degree in Telugu literature from Osmania University, Hyderabad.

Early political career

Congress Party 
Rao started his career with the Youth Congress Party in Medak district.

Telugu Desam Party 
Rao joined the Telugu Desam Party (TDP) in 1983 and contested against A. Madan Mohan and lost that election. He won four consecutive Assembly elections from Siddipet 1985 and 1999. From 1987 to 1988, he worked as Minister of Drought & Relief in Chief minister N. T. Rama Rao's cabinet. In 1990, he was appointed TDP convener for Medak, Nizamabad, and Adilabad districts. In 1996, he worked as Transport minister in Chief minister Nara Chandrababu Naidu's cabinet. He also served as the deputy speaker of the Andhra Pradesh Assembly from 2000 to 2001.

Telangana movement

On 27 April 2001, Rao resigned as Deputy Speaker, TDP Party as well. He asserted that the people of the Telangana region were being discriminated and believed that separate state is the only solution. In April 2001, he formed the Telangana Rashtra Samithi (TRS) Party (renamed to Bharatiya Rashra Samithi) at Jala Drushyam, Hyderabad to achieve Telangana statehood.
In the elections of 2004, Rao won the Siddipet state assembly constituency and also the Karimnagar Lok Sabha constituency, both as a TRS candidate. The TRS fought the 2004 general elections in alliance with the Indian National Congress with a Promise of Congress Party to give Telangana State and Rao was one of the five TRS candidates who was returned as MPs.

TRS was part of the United Progressive Alliance coalition government, led by Congress. He went on to become a Union Cabinet minister of Labour and Employment in the United Progressive Alliance government at the centre with his party colleague Aelay Narendra who became minister of Rural Development and Jannu Jakaraiah as chairman for National Minimum Wages Advisory Board. The party later withdrew from the coalition, saying that the Alliance was not minded to support a separate Telangana state. He has resigned as MP in 2006 on a challenge of Congress and won with a huge majority of more than 200,000 votes.  Again he resigned as MP in agitation of Telangana movement and won with a minor majority.

In 2009, Rao fought and won the Mahbubnagar Lok Sabha elections. In November 2009, he started a fast-unto-death, demanding the introduction of Telangana Bill in the Indian Parliament. After 11 days of beginning his fast, the Central Government said yes to Telangana as a separate state.

The TRS party fought the general elections as part of the opposition coalition led by TDP. In 2014, Rao was elected as MLA from Gajwel Assembly Constituency of Medak Dist of Telangana State with a majority of 19,218 and as MP from Medak with a majority of 397,029 on 16 May 2014.

In Telangana, the TRS, which led the campaign for a separate State for more than a decade, emerged victorious by winning 11 of the 17 Lok Sabha seats and 63 of the 119 Assembly seats, and emerged as the party with the largest vote share.

Chief Minister of Telangana (2014–present)

KCR was sworn in as the first chief minister of the Telangana state at 12.57 pm on 2 June 2014. Rao, a staunch believer in astrology, numerology and Vaastu, is reported to have fixed this time for his inauguration as per the advice of priests to suit his lucky number 'six'. Rao was re-elected 8 times as TRS president.

KCR shaped the Telangana state to a high degree of development both economically and culturally, right from the formative years of the state since 2014. His welfare programs are aimed at reviving the rural economy and are focused on the development of each community. An intensive household survey, Samagra Kutumba Survey (SKS) was done in a single day on 19 August 2014 across the state to arrive at citizen information for rolling out welfare programs. The data collected pertaining to 94 parameters, covered one crore four lakh households in the State.

KCR had revived the Telangana history, culture and festivals. The native festival Bathukamma, festival of flowers and Shakti was declared as state festival. In 2017, he declared Urdu to be the second official language of Telangana.

Rao launched the Aarogya Lakshmi scheme on 1 January 2015. He also launched the Double Bedroom Housing scheme, which aims to end slums in Telangana by providing free housing to the poor. On August 16, 2021, he launched the Dalit Bandu Scheme

In September 2018, Rao dissolved the Telangana Legislative Assembly, nine months before its term ends to go for an early election. In December 2018, Rao was re-elected as Chief Minister for the second term, after winning the 2018 Telangana Legislative Assembly election.

National Politics 

In May 2019, ahead of the 2019 Indian general election, KCR attempted to set up Federal Front along with leaders of other regional political parties. The Front's aim was to bring a non-Congress, non-BJP alliance to power at the Central Government of India.

Bharat Rashtra Samithi 
In June 2022, KCR announced to float a national party Bharat Rashtra Samithi (BRS). On 5 October 2022, at the day of Vijayadashami, KCR Renamed his party to Bharat Rashtra Samithi on party's Executive Council Meeting.

Personal life

Family
Rao is married to Shobha and has two children. His son, K. T. Rama Rao is a legislator from Sircilla and is the cabinet minister for IT, Municipal Administration & Urban Development. His daughter, Kavitha, served as M.P. from Nizamabad and currently serving as a Member of Legislative Council, Nizamabad since 2020. His nephew, Harish Rao, is MLA for Siddipet and Telangana's cabinet minister for finance. Rao has good command over languages like Telugu, English, Urdu, and Hindi. He lives with his family at the official chief minister residence, Pragathi Bhavan in Hyderabad.

In 2015, Rao adopted Pratyusha, who was rescued from domestic violence. She got married in 2020.

Views
Rao is follower of Sri Vaishnavism of Ramanuja, an ardent devotee of his guru Chinna Jeeyar and a strong believer of Hinduism and spirituality. To enhance spiritual consciousness, KCR had initiated reconstructing and renovating key temples across Telangana, such as Yadadri Kondagattu, and Vemulawada among others.

Other work 
Rao gave lyrics for the song "Garadi chesthundru" from the film Jai Bolo Telangana (2011), and wrote a song in Kolimi (2015). He also gave lyrics for songs to promote Mission Kakatiya and for his 2018 poll campaign.

Political statistics

Awards 
 Popular Choice Award at CNN-IBN Indian of the Year 2014
 Agricultural leadership award 2017
 Economic Times Awards – Business reformer of the year 2018

References

External links 

Official Website of the Office of the Chief Minister

India MPs 2004–2009
People from Telangana
Telangana politicians
Union Ministers from Telangana
Telangana Rashtra Samithi politicians
India MPs 2009–2014
Living people
1954 births
People from Medak
Andhra Pradesh MLAs 1985–1989
Andhra Pradesh MLAs 1989–1994
Andhra Pradesh MLAs 1994–1999
Andhra Pradesh MLAs 1999–2004
Telangana MLAs 2014–2018
Telugu Desam Party politicians
Lok Sabha members from Andhra Pradesh
Lok Sabha members from Telangana
Indian political party founders
Chief Ministers of Telangana
Deputy Speakers of the Andhra Pradesh Legislative Assembly